Narketpally is a village in Nalgonda district of the Indian state of Telangana. It is located in Narketpally mandal of Nalgonda division.

Narketpally mandal in Nalgonda District, Telangana, India.

Nearest Cities 
Nalgonda-18 km

Suryapet-53 km

Hyderabad-85 km

References

Villages in Nalgonda district
Mandal headquarters in Nalgonda district